Craig James Mundie (born July 1, 1949 in Cleveland, Ohio) is Senior Advisor to the CEO at Microsoft and its former Chief Research and Strategy Officer.

Biography
He started in the consumer platforms division in 1992, managing the production of Windows CE for hand-held and automotive systems and early console games. In 1997, Mundie oversaw the acquisition of WebTV Networks. He has championed Microsoft Trustworthy Computing and digital rights management.

In 1970, Mundie began his career as an operating system developer for the Data General Nova computer at Systems Equipment Corporation. SEC was subsequently acquired by Data General Corporation, where Mundie later became director of its advanced development facility in Research Triangle Park, North Carolina.  In 1982, he co-founded Alliant Computer Systems, holding a variety of positions there before becoming CEO. Alliant filed for bankruptcy in 1992.

Mundie holds a bachelor's degree in Electrical Engineering (1971) and a master's degree in Information Theory and Computer Science (1972) from Georgia Tech.

Mundie attended all meetings of the Bilderberg Group between 2003 and 2019 (except in 2005). He is currently a member of the Steering Committee, which determines the invitation list and the agenda for the upcoming annual Bilderberg meetings.

In April, 2009, President Obama named Mundie as a member of his President's Council of Advisors on Science and Technology (PCAST).

References

External links
 Microsoft Announces Plans for July 2008 Transition for Bill Gates
 Full text of a May 2001 speech by Mundie on Shared source

Microsoft employees
Microsoft evangelists
Living people
1949 births
Georgia Tech alumni
American computer businesspeople
Members of the Steering Committee of the Bilderberg Group
20th-century American businesspeople